Lammers Township is a township in Beltrami County, Minnesota, United States. The population was 492 at the 2000 census.

Lammers Township was named for two local businessmen, the brothers George A. and Albert J. Lammers.

Geography

The city of Solway is entirely within this township geographically but is a separate entity.

Major highway
  U.S. Route 2

Adjacent townships
 Buzzle Township (north)
 Liberty Township (northeast)
 Eckles Township (east)
 Grant Valley Township (southeast)
 Jones Township (south)
 Moose Creek Township, Clearwater County (southwest)
 Shevlin Township, Clearwater County (west)
 Dudley Township, Clearwater County (northwest)

Cemeteries
The township contains these two cemeteries: Lammers and Solway.

Demographics
At the 2000 census, there were 492 people, 179 households and 131 families residing in the township. The population density was 14.1 people per square mile (5.5/km). There were 190 housing units at an average density of 5.5/sq mi (2.1/km).  The racial makeup of the township was 94.72% White, 2.44% Native American, 0.20% Asian, 0.20% Pacific Islander, and 2.44% from two or more races. Hispanic or Latino of any race were 1.83% of the population.

There were 179 households, of which 41.3% had children under the age of 18 living with them, 58.7% were married couples living together, 10.6% had a female householder with no husband present, and 26.3% were non-families. 21.2% of all households were made up of individuals, and 8.9% had someone living alone who was 65 years of age or older. The average household size was 2.75 and the average family size was 3.24.

The age distribution was 31.5% under the age of 18, 7.9% from 18 to 24, 27.6% from 25 to 44, 22.2% from 45 to 64, and 10.8% who were 65 years of age or older. The median age was 36 years. For every 100 females, there were 100.8 males. For every 100 females age 18 and over, there were 98.2 males.

The median household income $43,375, and the median family income was $48,125. Males had a median income of $30,250 versus $21,250 for females. The per capita income for the township was $16,894. About 9.4% of families and 12.1% of the population were below the poverty line, including 16.2% of those under age 18 and 13.5% of those age 65 or over.

References
 United States National Atlas
 United States Census Bureau 2007 TIGER/Line Shapefiles
 United States Board on Geographic Names (GNIS)

Townships in Beltrami County, Minnesota
Townships in Minnesota